{{Speciesbox
| image =
| genus = Wielandia
| species = elegans
| authority = Baill.
| subdivision_ranks = Subspecies
| subdivision = Wielandia elegans var. perrieri Leandri, 1939
| synonyms_ref =
| synonyms = Savia elegans <small>(Baill.) Müll.Arg.</small>
}}Wielandia elegans'' is a species of flowering plants, of the family Phyllanthaceae. It is found on Aldabra, Seychelles, Comoros and Madagascar.

References

External links
 Wielandia elegans at Tropicos
 Wielandia elegans at The Plant List

Phyllanthaceae
Plants described in 1858
Taxa named by Henri Ernest Baillon